Ridgway Dam is an earthen dam on the Uncompahgre River which impounds Ridgway Reservoir, located about 6 miles (10 km) north of the town of Ridgway in Ouray County, Colorado.

Ridgway Dam was built as part of the Dallas Creek Project.  Construction began in 1978 and completed in 1987.  The construction of the dam forced the re-routing of U.S. Highway 550 to the east and the abandonment of the Ridgway Branch of the Denver and Rio Grande Western Railroad.

Hydroelectric retrofitting
In 2014, work was completed on retrofitting the dam to add a hydroelectric plant. The dam's operator, Tri-County Water Conservancy District, installed two turbines and generators, an 8 kW system and a 7.2 MW system. The larger one is used in summer and the smaller one in winter. The electricity created is sold to the Tri-State Generation & Transmission Association and to the City of Aspen. Construction of the new hydroelectric project cost approximately $18 million. In an average year, the two generators produce about 24,000 megawatt hours of electric power.

See also
 List of reservoirs and dams in the United States

References

External links
 U.S. Bureau of Reclamation - Dallas Creek Project

Dams in Colorado
Hydroelectric power plants in Colorado
Buildings and structures in Ouray County, Colorado
United States Bureau of Reclamation dams
Dams completed in 1987
Energy infrastructure completed in 2014
Dams in the Colorado River basin